Colin Butler works in public health.

Colin Butler is also the name of:

Colin Butler, musician in Pompeii
Colin Butler (singer), see 1976 in country music
Colin Butler (entomologist) (1913–2016), British entomologist
Colin Butler, character in the BBC television drama series Our Friends in the North